The 2023 Danilith Nokere Koerse was the 77th edition of the Nokere Koerse one-day road cycling race. It was held on 15 March 2023 as a category 1.Pro race on the 2023 UCI ProSeries calendar.

Teams 
Ten of the 18 UCI WorldTeams, thiirteen UCI ProTeams, and one UCI Continental teams made up the 24 teams that participated in the race. Of the 131 riders who were entered into the race, only 113 riders finished the race.

UCI WorldTeams

 
 
 
 
 
 
 
 
 
 

UCI ProTeams

 
 
 
 
 
 
 
 
 
 
 
 
 

UCI Continental Teams

Result

References

External links 
 

2023
Nokere Koerse
Nokere Koerse
March 2023 sports events in Belgium